Tournesol may refer to:
Sunflower
Chrozophora
Professor Calculus (French: Professeur Tryphon Tournesol), a fictional character of The Adventures of Tintin
Tournesol (satellite), a satellite launched in 1971
"Tournesol" (magazine), a French comic book published since October 1960 by Ligue pour la Lecture de la Bible in Valence

See also
Turnsole